The Nihon Kokudo Keikaku Summers was a professional golf tournament in Japan from 1977 to 1982. It was an event on the Japan Golf Tour from 1978.

Tournament hosts

Winners

Notes

References

Former Japan Golf Tour events
Defunct golf tournaments in Japan
Recurring sporting events established in 1977
Recurring sporting events disestablished in 1982
1977 establishments in Japan
1982 disestablishments in Japan